Edwin Evariste Moise (December 22, 1918 – December 18, 1998)
was an American mathematician and mathematics education reformer. After his retirement from mathematics he became a literary critic of 19th-century English poetry and had several notes published in that field.

Early life and education

Edwin E. Moise was born December 22, 1918, in New Orleans, Louisiana.
He graduated from Tulane University in 1940. He worked as a cryptanalyst and Japanese translator for the Office of the Chief of Naval Operations during World War II.

He received his Ph.D. degree in mathematics from the University of Texas in 1947. His dissertation was titled "An indecomposable continuum which is homeomorphic to each of its nondegenerate subcontinua," a topic in continuum theory, and was written under the direction of Robert Lee Moore. In his dissertation Moise coined the term pseudo-arc.

Career

Moise taught at the University of Michigan from 1947 to 1960. He was James B. Conant Professor of education and mathematics at Harvard University  from 1960 to 1971. He held a Distinguished Professorship at Queens College, City University of New York from 1971 to 1987.

Moise started working on the topology of 3-manifolds while at the University of Michigan. During 1949–1951 he held an appointment at the Institute for Advanced Study during which he proved Moise's theorem that every 3-manifold can be triangulated in an essentially unique way.

Moise joined the School Mathematics Study Group when it started in 1958, as a member of the geometry writing team. The team produced several course outlines and sample pages for a 10th grade geometry course, and then Moise and Floyd L. Downs wrote a geometry textbook, based on the team's approach, that was published in 1964. The textbook used metric postulates instead of Euclid's postulates, a controversial approach supported by some mathematicians such as Saunders Mac Lane but opposed by others such as Alexander Wittenberg and Morris Kline.

Moise was a president of the Mathematical Association of America, a vice-president of the American Mathematical Society, a Fellow of the American Academy of Arts and Sciences, and was on the executive committee of the International Commission on Mathematical Instruction.

Moise retired from Queens College in 1987 and started a second career studying 19th century English poetry. He had six short notes of literary criticism published.

In the middle and late 1960s, Moise was among the few members of the senior faculty at Harvard University who strongly and publicly opposed the Vietnam War.

Moise died in New York City on December 18, 1998, aged 79.

See also
 Moise's theorem

Selected publications

References

External links

MAA presidents: Edwin Evariste Moise

1918 births
1998 deaths
20th-century American mathematicians
Queens College, City University of New York faculty
Geometers
Harvard University faculty
Institute for Advanced Study visiting scholars
Presidents of the Mathematical Association of America
Topologists
Tulane University alumni
University of Michigan faculty
University of Texas at Austin College of Natural Sciences alumni
Mathematicians from Louisiana